Jonathan Lucas (born October 29, 1975) is an American film director and screenwriter. He is best known for his collaborative work with Scott Moore, which includes The Hangover, 21 & Over and Bad Moms.

Life and career
He is a graduate of Yale University as well as an alumnus of Pingry School. He started working as an assistant for screenwriter Daniel Petrie, Jr. in the '90s along with Scott Moore, who would become his longtime writing partner.

The first script Lucas and Moore ever wrote together was Flypaper, although the movie didn't get made until 2011. In addition, they both worked on providing uncredited rewrites on Wedding Crashers, 27 Dresses, Chicken Little, Monster-in-Law, and Mr. Woodcock.

In 2005 and 2007, they were hired to write the screenplays for the family comedies Rebound and Full of It. They also participated on the screenplay for the holiday comedy Four Christmases in 2008. The following year, they wrote the successful romantic comedy Ghosts of Girlfriends Past. However, their breakthrough success came with  The Hangover, which became the highest-grossing R-rated comedy in the United States at the time. The movie spawned two sequels but did not include involvement by Lucas and Moore. Due to the success of The Hangover, the duo penned another R-rated comedy: the 2011 film, The Change-Up.

In 2013, Lucas and Moore made their co-directorial debuts with the comedy film, 21 & Over. In October 2012, they sold to ABC a pilot for a new comedy show named Mixology, which follows five guys and five girls "trying to find love at a trendy Manhattan bar," all over the course of a single night. The show was picked up to series in May 2013 and premiered on ABC on February 26, 2014, but was cancelled after only one season.

Film credits

Television credits
 2014: Mixology (co-creator)

References

External links

Living people
American male screenwriters
Writers from Summit, New Jersey
Yale University alumni
1976 births
Screenwriters from New Jersey